Walter Tresch (born 4 April 1948) is a former Swiss alpine skier.  He competed at the 1972 and 1976 Winter Olympics. Tresch is the owner of a sole proprietorship for trading in wine and sporting goods. A sports promotion foundation in Silenen is named after him.

References

External links
 
 

1948 births
Living people
Swiss male alpine skiers
Alpine skiers at the 1972 Winter Olympics
Alpine skiers at the 1976 Winter Olympics
FIS Alpine Ski World Cup champions
Olympic alpine skiers of Switzerland